Nickajack Dam is a hydroelectric dam in Marion County in the U.S. state of Tennessee. The dam impounds the  Nickajack Lake and feeds into Guntersville Lake. Nickajack Dam is named for a Cherokee village once located just upstream from the dam (the site is now submerged). The village was the namesake for Nickajack Cave, which was partially flooded by the reservoir.

Location

This stretch of the river marks a region where the river begins to exit the once treacherous Tennessee River Gorge en route to the flatlands around Guntersville, Alabama. Tennessee State Highway 156 passes just south of Nickajack Dam, and Interstate 24 passes a few miles to the north.

Capacity

The electrical generating capacity of Nickajack is 104 megawatts.

Nickajack is serviced by a  auxiliary lock that can lift or lower as many as nine large barges at a time  between Guntersville Lake and Nickajack Lake.  The dam's original design allowed for an  main lock beside the auxiliary, but it was never completed. This lock, as well as every lock on the Tennessee River, is operated and maintained by the U.S. Army Corps of Engineers.

Background and construction

Before the completion of Hales Bar Dam in 1913, the Tennessee River Gorge was one of the major impediments— along with Muscle Shoals and the Elk River shoals— to year-round navigation on the Tennessee River.  Along with unpredictable water levels, the gorge was filled with numerous water hazards, some of which had been given nicknames such as "The Suck", "The Skillet", and "The Pan."  In the early 1900s, the U.S. Army Corps of Engineers realized that a dam near the southwestern end of the gorge would flood the water hazards and eliminate the gorge's rapid downstream current.  Chattanooga engineer Josephus Conn Guild offered to raise funds to build this dam in exchange for rights to the dam's electrical output.  After receiving authorization from Congress in 1904, he organized the Chattanooga and Tennessee River Power Company (later TEPCO) in 1905, and the company began building Hales Bar Dam in October of that year. Hales Bar's weak limestone foundation— which hadn't been considered in the selection of the dam site— presented numerous obstacles from the outset, but the dam was finally completed in 1913.

In 1939, after a contentious court battle, TEPCO was forced to sell its assets— including Hales Bar Dam— to the Tennessee Valley Authority.  The dam had been leaking since its construction, and TVA immediately initiated a series of foundation improvements that by 1943 had succeeded in halting the leaks.  In 1960, however, the leaks had returned, spilling at an alarming .  Around the same time, TVA began expanding locks on its dams to at least  to accommodate the increase in traffic the river had experienced since World War II, and it was determined that expanding the Hales Bar lock would be "prohibitively" expensive.  Rather than spend the necessary expenses to upgrade Hales Bar, a decision was made in 1963 to build a new dam altogether on a more solid bedrock a few miles downstream.

The Nickajack Dam project was authorized January 9, 1964, and construction began April 1, 1964. Funding set aside for repair work on Hales Bar was transferred to the Nickajack project. Two generators and several switchyard parts were moved from Hales Bar Dam to the new dam. Construction was completed on December 14, 1967, at a cost of $73 million (equivalent to $ in ). Operations at Hales Bar Dam were halted the following day, and by September 1968, Hales Bar Dam had been dismantled and its reservoir merged with Nickajack Lake.

See also

Nickajack
Hales Bar Dam
Dams and reservoirs of the Tennessee River

References

External links

TVA: Nickajack Reservoir
Hydroelectric plants in Tennessee

Dams on the Tennessee River
Dams in Tennessee
Buildings and structures in Marion County, Tennessee
Hydroelectric power plants in Tennessee
Tennessee Valley Authority dams
Dams completed in 1967
Energy infrastructure completed in 1967